The 2020 Women's Asian Olympic Qualification Tournament is a volleyball tournament for women's national teams organised by Asian Volleyball Confederation (AVC) and Fédération Internationale de Volleyball (FIVB), to be held in Nakhon Ratchasima, Thailand from 7 to 12 January 2020. 8 teams will play in the tournament, where the winners will qualify to the 2020 women's Olympic volleyball tournament.

Qualification

The maximum of 8 teams in AVC IOQT events will be selected by:

 8 teams based on the rankings of the 2019 Asian championship.
 Winners and runners-up of each pool in the preliminary round will qualify.
 The unused quotas will be reallocated by next ranked teams.

Qualified teams

Unused quotas

Pools composition
Teams were seeded in the first two positions of each pool following the serpentine system according to their 2019 Asian Women's Volleyball Championship. 
 Pot 1: The two highest-ranked teams
 Pot 2: The next two highest-ranked teams
The remaining two positions of each pool will be randomly drawn. The draw was held in Bangkok, Thailand on 28 October 2019.
 Pot 3: The two qualified teams
 Pot 4: The team that host chose in its pool (pool A).

This meant the 7 teams, qualified and qualifiers, were seeded thus: 

Draw

Venue

Pool standing procedure
 Number of matches won
 Match points
 Sets ratio
 Points ratio
 Result of the last match between the tied teams

Match won 3–0 or 3–1: 3 match points for the winner, 0 match points for the loser
Match won 3–2: 2 match points for the winner, 1 match point for the loser

Preliminary round
All times are Indochina Time (UTC+07:00).

Pool A

|}

|}

Pool B

|}

|}

Final round
All times are Indochina Time (UTC+07:00).

Semi-finals

|}

3rd place

|}

Final

|}

Final standing

<onlyinclude>{| class="wikitable" style="text-align:center;"
|-
!width=40|Rank
!width=180|Team
|- bgcolor=#ccffcc
|1
|style="text-align:left;"|
|-
|2
|style="text-align:left;"|
|-
|3
|style="text-align:left;"|
|-
|4
|style="text-align:left;"|
|-
|5
|style="text-align:left;"|
|-
|6
|style="text-align:left;"|
|-
|7
|style="text-align:left;"|
|}

Statistics leaders

Preliminary round

References

External links
Fédération Internationale de Volleyball – official website

2020 in volleyball
Volleyball qualification for the 2020 Summer Olympics
2020 in women's volleyball
Vol
January 2020 sports events in Asia